Alfred Hirt House is a historic home located in Greencastle Township, Putnam County, Indiana. It was built in 1880, and is a two-story, brick dwelling with Second Empire and Italianate style design elements. It consists of a main block with flanking gabled extensions and a one-story wing.  The house features a corner tower with a mansard roof and one-bay decorative front porch. Also on the property is a contributing carriage house.

It was listed on the National Register of Historic Places in 1991.

References

Houses on the National Register of Historic Places in Indiana
Italianate architecture in Indiana
Second Empire architecture in Indiana
Houses completed in 1880
Buildings and structures in Putnam County, Indiana
National Register of Historic Places in Putnam County, Indiana